Lloyds Bank is a retail bank in the United Kingdom established in 1765, known as Lloyds TSB from 1998 to 2013

Lloyds Bank can also refer to:
Lloyds Banking Group, formed in 2009 from the acquisition of HBOS by Lloyds TSB
Lloyds Bank of Canada, existed from 1986 to 1990
Lloyds Bank International, subsidiary of Lloyds Bank plc operating outside of the UK
Lloyds Bank, Bristol, grade II listed building